Ben Mansfield (born 29 May 1983) is an English actor, best known for playing Captain Becker in the ITV sci-fi drama Primeval.

Career 
Mansfield portrayed Captain Becker in the ITV sci-fi drama Primeval, depicting the Captain of a special unit from the military which works with the ARC. Mansfield was spotted for the role when auditioning for the part of Arthur in the BBC Television series Merlin. Mansfield got down to the final two for the part, sadly losing out to Bradley James. Merlins casting director, who also worked as casting director for Primeval, suggested that he audition for Captain Becker and he subsequently joined the cast in its third season in 2009.

On 1 July 2014, he announced on Twitter that he will be playing the part of Alex in channel 4's new comedy, 'Not Safe For Work' (formerly named 'CUT').

Mansfield landed a role in the third series of ITV's Endeavour, which aired 3 January 2016.

Theatre 
His theatrical credits include
French Without Tears  by Terence Rattigan (English Touring Theatre) Lead role: Alan Howard
Jenufa by Timberlake Wertenbaker (Natural Perspective at the Arcola Theatre)
Much Ado About Nothing by William Shakespeare (The New Shakespeare Company at Regent's Park Open Air Theatre)
A Midsummer Night's Dream by William Shakespeare (directed by Peter Hall at the Rose Theatre)
Twelfth Night by William Shakespeare (directed by Peter Hall at The National Theatre)
Henry IV Parts One and Two by William Shakespeare (playing Hotspur and Pistol)(directed by Peter Hall at The Theatre Royal, Bath.
One Man, Two Guvnors at The Theatre Royal Haymarket, London
Relative Values at Theatre Royal, Bath & Harold Pinter Theatre
Great Britain at the Haymarket Theatre

Mansfield appeared in Noël Coward's Relative Values at The Theatre Royal, Bath, between 12 and 29 June 2013 as 'Don Lucas'. The production, directed by Sir Trevor Nunn toured from Bath to Bristol before transferring to the Harold Pinter Theatre for a limited season from 19 March to 21 June 2014.

In July 2016, it was announced that Mansfield will be playing the role of 'Larry' in Mart Crawley's 'The Boys In the Band'.

Filmography

References

External links

Dalzell and Beresford: Ben Mansfield

1983 births
Alumni of Bristol Old Vic Theatre School
English male stage actors
English male television actors
Living people
People educated at Gresham's School